Marcela Delpastre, also known as Marcelle Delpastre, was an Occitan- and French-language author from Limousin. She was born on September 2, 1925, and died on February 6, 1998.

Biography

Early years
Marcela Delpastre was born on February 2, 1925, in Germont, near the commune of Chamberet in the département of Corrèze. The daughter, granddaughter and great-granddaughter of local farmers, she grew up in the heart of Limousin’s countryside civilization. At home, she would hear and learn two languages: Occitan and French. She went to primary school in Surdoux and Saint-Léonard in Haute-Vienne and then to secondary school in Brive where she took a baccalauréat in philosophy and literature. She later entered the college of decorative arts of Limoges where she developed a strong liking for human shapes (faces and feminine curves) and beauty in general.

In 1945, she returned to the family farm in Germont where she spent the rest of her life working the land, something she did "because one has to earn their daily bread". In the meantime, whether milking the cows or driving a tractor, she’d still think of apt rhymes for the poems she wrote. Poetry accompanied her all day long and she’d always carry a wee jotter and a pen in her pocket. When inspiration came, when the words were there, fine and ready, Marcela took a break and immediately put them down on paper. Indeed, most of her masterpieces probably sprang from a bundle of straw in a stable or in the middle of a field.

From the end of the 1940s to the early years of the following decade, as the exercise books in which she wrote her poems and thoughts were beginning to heap up, Marcela Delpastre sent some of her works to literary journals and arts reviews. She was greatly encouraged by the correspondence she engaged in. As her texts got published, Marcela grew increasingly famous among the well-read people of Limousin.

Local literary recognition
In the 1960s, Marcela Delpastre was the helpless witness of the death of her native village of Germont and the painful decline of the millennial farming civilization of Limousin. The tractors replaced the oxen, the machines did the hands and television the evening gatherings... With all of her heart, Marcela now immersed herself into the tales, the legends and the traditions of her home país and met with Robert Joudoux, from the Lemouzi magazine, and Jean Mouzat, another Occitan author.

Marcela Delpastre’s first work in lenga d’òc was called La Lenga que tant me platz (The Language I Love So):
"E si m’aproisme a la senta taula, voldriá 'na òstia de pan de blat — per comuniar tot per lo còp emb lo bon Dieu e emb la terra — ensemble belament 'semblats, coma l’alen a la saba daus blats, — dins la lenga que tant me platz."
"And should I get near the holy table, I’d ask for a host of wheat bread — to receive communion both from Our Lord and the earth — the two of them so beautifully alike, as the wind is the sap of corn, — in the language I love so."
From then on, Marcela decided to write in Limousin, both the tongue and the place, and about Limousin. In the aforementioned magazine were subsequently published a couple of poems, among which Lo Rossinhòl e l’eglantina (The Nightingale & the Wild Rose) and Lo Chamin de tèrra (The Dirt Track). For an easier writing, she also learned the normalized Occitan spelling.

In the mid-1960s, Marcela began collecting and re-inventing traditional tales from her native Limousin. The first book was published in 1970 and its title was: Los Contes dau Pueg Gerjant (The Tales of Mount Gerjant). At the same time, she did the work of an ethnologist and wrote, in French, Le Tombeau des ancêtres (The Tomb of Our Ancestors) about the customs and beliefs surrounding local religious festivals and cults. In 1968, La Vinha dins l’òrt (The Vine in the Garden) was released: this poem won an award at the Jaufre Rudel competition. Its French version, La Vigne dans le jardin was adapted for the stage by the Radio-Limoges drama company. They adapted more texts by Marcela Delpastre later in the decade, among which featured L’Homme éclaté (The Exploded Man) and La Marche à l’étoile (Walking to the Star). Marcela kept on writing and published other poems in several reviews, such as Lemouzi, Traces, Poésie 1, Vent Terral and Òc.

Occitania-wide acclaim
In 1974, Saumes pagans (Pagan Psalms) appeared in the collection called Messatges de l’IEO. It’s with these poems that Marcela Delpastre truly gained recognition from the whole Occitan literary world. In Le Bourgeois et le paysan (The Bourgeois & the Farmer) she went another step farther in portraying the customs, beliefs and oral tradition of Limousin, this time around the theme of fire. Later, in her Bestiari lemosin (The Limousin Bestiary), she focused on wild animals and cattle and mixed reality with mythology. By the end of the 1970s Marcela also met two very important men for her career: one is Micheu Chapduelh and the other is Jan dau Melhau. She regularly featured in their review, Lo Leberaubre, and grew popular beyond the circle of her readers by giving her opinion in articles and interviews in the local Limousin press (Limousin Magazine, La Montagne, L’Écho, Le Populaire...), but most of all, among Occitan activists thanks to magazines like Òc, Occitans and especially Connaissance des Pays d’Òc, with Ives Roqueta’s help.

In the last years of her life, Marcela Delpastre (and her friend Jan dau Melhau) spent her time dusting off hundreds of unpublished texts. Suffering from Charcot disease, she died in her bed on February 6, 1998, in her Germont farm, where she was born, where she’d always stayed and worked. Jan dau Melhau, her sole legatee, has since released more of her writings for the Lo Chamin de Sent-Jaume publishing house. The poet’s works are kept at Limoges’s City Library.

A poet, a story-teller, an author and an ethnologist, Marcela Delpastre is now considered one of the ten most important writers of the 20th century, alongside the likes of Joan Bodon, Bernat Manciet, Renat Nelli and Max Roqueta. The message of this woman, who never left her home land of Limousin, is one of universal significance, one that addresses everybody, and this is probably what makes her words so strong and beautiful.

Extracts

Selected bibliography
1964 : La lenga que tant me platz (Lemouzi, Tulle)
1965 : Lo Rossinhòu e l’Eglantina (Lemouzi)
1967 : La Vinha dins l’òrt (Escòla Jaufre Rudel)
1968 : Lo Chamin de terra (Lemouzi)
1970 : Los Contes dau pueg Gerjant (Lemouzi)
1974 : Saumes pagans (IEO-Novelum)
1982 : Sorcellerie et magie en Limousin (Lemouzi)  
1985 : Louanges pour la femme (Friches, Saint-Yrieix-la-Perche)
1987 : Nathanaël sous le figuier / Nathanaël jos le figier (Lo Chamin de Sent Jaume, Meuzac)
1998 : Le paysan, l'arbre et la vigne (Lo Chamin de Sent Jaume, Meuzac)
1989 : Le passage / La trauchada (Lemouzi)
1990 : L'histoire dérisoire (Fédérop, Gardonne)
1996 : Las Vias priondas de la memòria (L’Ostal del Libre, Aurillac)
1997 : Paraulas per questa terra (Lo Chamin de Sent Jaume, Meuzac)
1997 : Cinq heures du soir & Proses pour l’après-midi, (Payot, Paris)
1998 : Le jeu de patience (Payot, Paris)
1998 : Les chemins creux (Presses de la Cité)
1998 : Le jardin sous la lune / L'òrt jos lo figier (Lo Chamin de Sent Jaume, Meuzac)  
1999 : Saumes pagans (Lo Chamin de Sent Jaume, Meuzac)
1999 : Poèmes dramatiques (Lo Chamin de Sent Jaume, Meuzac)
2000 : Le Bourgeois et le paysan, les contes du feu (Payot, Paris)
2000 : Poésie modale (Lo Chamin de Sent Jaume, Meuzac)
2001 : Le Testament de l’eau douce (Fédérop, Gardonne)
2001 : Les Petits recueils (Lo Chamin de Sent Jaume, Meuzac)
2001 : D’una lenga l’autra (Lo Chamin de Sent Jaume, Meuzac)
2001 : Ballades (Lo Chamin de Sent Jaume, Meuzac)
2002 : Le Chasseur d’ombres: et autres psaumes (Lo Chamin de Sent Jaume, Meuzac)
2002 : L’Araignée et la rose: et autres psaumes (Lo Chamin de Sent Jaume, Meuzac)
2003 : Bestiari lemosin (Lo Chamin de Sent Jaume, Meuzac)
2004 : Mémoires (Lo Chamin de Sent Jaume, Meuzac)
2005 : Des trois passages en Limousin (Lo Chamin de Sent Jaume, Meuzac)

References

External links
 Corrèze.org
 Marcela Delpastre, à fleur de l'âme, Mikela Stent & Charles Camberoque (2016, Vent Terral) , 
 An article in Lire magazine
 A dedicated weblog
 Philippe Gardy: Figuras dau poèta e dau poèma dins l'escritura occitana contemporanèa (Edicions Jorn)
 Plein Chant magazine, special edition, #71/72 (2000–01)
 Lo Leberaubre magazine, special edition, #23/24 (1999), Omenatge a Marcela Delpastre''
 Bleu de Paille
 Cardabelle, l'Esprit d'une terre
 Chants corréziens—French folk songs from Corrèze, collected and ed. by Hugh Shields (1974), with sound files of 25 songs including 6 sung by Marcela and 3 by her mother Marie-Louise Deslpastre

Occitan-language writers
1925 births
1998 deaths
People from Limousin